is a Japanese footballer who plays for Sagan Tosu.

Club statistics
Updated to 19 July 2022.

References

External links
Profile at Kyoto Sanga
Profile at Mito HollyHock

1990 births
Living people
Komazawa University alumni
Association football people from Tochigi Prefecture
Japanese footballers
J1 League players
J2 League players
Tochigi SC players
Mito HollyHock players
Kyoto Sanga FC players
Sagan Tosu players
Association football midfielders
Universiade gold medalists for Japan
Universiade medalists in football
Medalists at the 2011 Summer Universiade